The Haredi burqa sect, is a religious group within Haredi Judaism, primarily concentrated in Israel, which claims that modesty requires a burqa-style covering of a woman's entire body, a  (plural , "shawl"), and a veil covering the face. In effect, no skin is exposed to the public. The garment is also called , a play of the word  (Yiddish, "devout") and "burqa". The group, which was estimated to number several hundred , is concentrated in the town of Beit Shemesh. Members of the sect rarely leave their homes, and are accompanied by their female children, also dressed in long robes, when they do.

The sect's beliefs have proven controversial in Haredi circles, with strong and vocal condemnation of the face-covering veil by many Haredi organizations, including Edah HaChareidis.

History
The  as a mode of dress for Haredi women was encouraged by Bruria Keren, an Israeli religious leader who taught a strict (by Orthodox standards) interpretation of Jewish scripture for female adherents. Keren, who covers herself in several layers of clothing, claimed that covering women was originally a Jewish tradition, and that she had seen a 400-year-old picture of Jewish women covered from head to toe. There are also Sephardic women who claim that their mothers covered their bodies entirely, so that their figures could not be discerned. One sect member is reported to have explained that she was "following these rules of modesty to save men from themselves. A man who sees a woman's body parts is sexually aroused, and this might cause him to commit sin. Even if he doesn't actually sin physically, his impure thoughts are sin in themselves." The religious group, which was estimated to number around 100 in 2008 and may have grown to several hundred , is concentrated in Beit Shemesh, but also has followers in Safed and Jerusalem. The majority of the women have secular backgrounds.

Child abuse allegations 
In February 2008, Keren was arrested on charges of severely abusing her children. Identified in court as "B.", she was convicted by the Jerusalem District Court in 2009 on three counts of abuse of a minor or helpless person, and 25 counts of assault in aggravated circumstances, and was sentenced to four years in prison. Her husband, identified in court as "M.", was also convicted of 10 counts of assault, and three counts of abuse of a minor or helpless person, and was sentenced to six months in jail.

Other practices
Keren does not speak in front of men, and has taken on various ascetic practices. During her prison term, she was hospitalized several times for malnutrition and other maladies as a result of her unwillingness to eat the food provided. Some members of the group reportedly do not believe in vaccination or modern medicine. On February 8, 2013, one woman's baby allegedly died from untreated flu, with the parents then fleeing from the law. On another occasion, a newborn baby had to be taken to a hospital by force, after the mother refused to go to a hospital to give birth to avoid contact with hospitals and physicians. Other cases of child abuse and neglect have been reported within the group.

Perception in Israeli society
The Israeli press has adopted the informal epithet "Taliban mothers" to refer to the followers of Keren's teachings on modesty. According to Miriam Shaviv, the estimated 100 "gullible and needy" Jewish women, for whom Keren was a holy woman, were not forced, but convinced by Keren "that the ideal for a woman was not to be seen in public (and not even to be heard – she used to stop talking for days on end). Negating themselves, she was telling them, making themselves invisible, was the height of frumkeit, while, in fact, it has no basis whatsoever in halachah". The Israel National Council for the Child has requested that the Welfare Ministry look into the matter and make sure this behavior is not harmful to the girls.

Religious and legal reaction
The response by other Ultra Orthodox schools has been stronger than the rest of the public, and characterized by consternation, particularly against the  garment. An anonymous  condemning the "cult" of "epikoros" women was posted in Jerusalem in September 2011. The Edah HaChareidis issued an edict declaring the act of wearing the shawl to be a sexual fetish as deviant as scant clothing or nudity. "There is a real danger that by exaggerating, you are doing the opposite of what is intended, [resulting in] severe transgressions in sexual matters", explains Edah member Rabbi Shlomo Pappenheim. The religious court of Beit Shemesh issued a sharp condemnation of the group, and warned Jewish women and girls not to be drawn after them or follow their customs.

People in Beit Shemesh, which includes some of the most religiously radical sects in ultra-Orthodoxy, considered the sect to be zealous to the point of ridicule. Even Sikrikim came out against the phenomenon of wearing veils, which they consider extreme. The women were regularly ostracized and humiliated by the local Haredi community because of their clothing. "We pulled them off buses and yelled at them, 'Desecrators of God's name!, one inhabitant said. The movement has caused severe distress among the women's husbands and relatives, though most husbands endure it. Some men accuse the covered women of being immodest, because they draw more attention to themselves with their unusual dress. One man went to a rabbinical court in an attempt to get a ruling to force his wife to stop wearing the burka. Instead, the court, however, found the woman's behaviour so "extreme" that it ordered the couple to undergo an immediate religious divorce.

In 2014, Israeli police shot a member of the sect after she walked into the Western Wall area without stopping at a security checkpoint. She survived, and was taken to the hospital for treatment.

Literature
Yair Nehorai, an Israeli lawyer who has represented individuals involved in the "Taliban Mother" case and other ultra-Orthodox extremists, has written a book loosely based on the real-life "Taliban Mother" case. The book, Taliban Son, has been released in Hebrew and in German translation.

Similar movements
Another Haredi group which requires female adherents to wear Islamic style veils is the Lev Tahor cult of Israeli-Canadian rabbi Shlomo Helbrans. However it is not a burqa sect but a chador sect, as the women's faces are not covered. A Messianic claimant and faith healer from Tel Aviv named Goel Ratzon reportedly lived with 32 women who neighbors said "wore modest clothing that neighbors likened to those of religious Muslims" before he was arrested.

References

External links
Israel Hayom: Ex-Member of Beit Shemesh "Burqa Cult" Reveals Truth About Group

Jewish religious movements
Veils
Haredi Judaism in Israel
Jewish religious clothing